Nitroxylic acid or hydronitrous acid is an unstable reduced oxonitrogen acid. It has formula H4N2O4 containing nitrogen in the +2 oxidation state.

The first clue that nitroxylic acid exists was when Edward Bedford Maxted electrolysed sodium nitrite dissolved in liquid ammonia. A bright yellow substance deposited on the cathode. He called this disodium nitrite.  The disodium nitrite could also be made by mixing ammonia solutions of sodium and sodium nitrite in the complete absence of water. Disodium nitrite reacts with water to form sodium nitrite, sodium hydroxide and hydrogen. Other ways to make the disodium nitrite include reacting sodium with ammonium nitrate or electrolysing sodium nitrate solution. Note that the disodium nitrite is very explosive, and experimenters often had their apparatus destroyed when making it. Disodium nitrite reacts with oxygen and carbon dioxide explosively. The substance is nowadays called sodium nitroxylate and has CAS number 13968-14-4.

Lithium sodium nitroxylate LiNaNO2 also exists and explodes at 130 °C.

Nitroxylic acid might be produced when nitrous acid is reduced by the Eu2+ ion.

References

Nitrogen oxoacids